Ibrahim Abu Mohamed is an Egyptian-born and educated Sunni Islamic scholar and Grand Mufti of Australia from September 2011 to March 2018. He became Grand Mufti again after Afifi's death.

Personal life
Abu Mohamed was born in Binufar, Gharbia Governorate, Egypt. Abu Mohamed studied at the Al-Azhar University in Cairo, where he received his doctorate; he taught Islamic studies from 1988 to 1996 in Abu Dhabi, United Arab Emirates. On 18 September 2011 he was appointed as Australia's Grand Mufti by the Australian National Imams Council (ANIC), replacing Fehmi Naji, who retired due to poor health.

Activities
After moving to Sydney in 1997, Abu Mohamed founded a radio station soon called Quran Kareem Radio, broadcasting Koranic readings and other religious programs 24 hours a day. The radio station's content is mostly in Arabic; it relies on local donations and advertising for funding. In 2005, Abu Mohamed founded a respite centre for Muslims with special needs, which he still manages.

In 2012 Abu Mohamed visited the Gaza Strip, where he met Hamas leader Ismail Haniyeh and told local news agencies, "I am pleased to stand on the land of jihad to learn from its sons".  He is said to support Yusuf al-Qaradawi, who he met in Qatar in April 2013.

Mohamed is member of a Tribunal which resolves disputes using Sharia Law based mediation. These mediation sessions are conducted weekly, from Abu Mohamed's Fairfield office.

Views
Abu Mohamed was described as "a political moderate, [but] religiously orthodox" in a 2011 article in the Sydney Morning Herald.

In 2011 Mohammed said that Sharia laws which call for "freedom, justice and right of speech" correspond with Australian laws.

In response to concerns over the radicalisation of young Muslim men in Australia, Abu Mohamed has stated that he believes that the cause is the spread of "backyard prayer halls," run by self-styled imams preaching extremist ideologies. The solution to radicalisation, according to Abu Mohamed, is for the Muslim community to build more traditional Islamic centres; his long-term vision, along with the ANIC, was to facilitate the building of mosques large enough to accommodate gyms, lecture halls and facilities for women and children. According to Abu Mohamed, the Muslim community's building applications for new mosques are frequently met with rejection from local councils; he argues that existing mosques cannot keep pace with the community's growing needs, leading to increased feelings of isolation, rejection and anger among Muslims.

Lobbying
In October 2014 Abu Mohamed and the ANIC called for the offence of "advocating terrorism" to be removed from the "Foreign Fighters Bill", currently before the Australian Parliament, saying a cleric could fall foul of the law simply by "advocated the duty of a Muslim to defend his land" or if he referred to stories in the Quran, Bible and Torah in his sermons.

After the November 2015 Paris attacks, in a Press Release by the Australian National Imams Council, Abu Mohamed made some controversial remarks that: "These recent incidents highlight the fact that current strategies to deal with the threat of terrorism are not working. It is therefore imperative that all causative factors such as racism, Islamophobia, curtailing freedoms through securitisation, duplicitous foreign policies and military intervention must be comprehensively addressed". He was later criticized for not directly condemning the Paris attacks. This led to a further statement: "We wish to emphasise it is incorrect to imply that the reference to causative factors provides justification for these acts of terrorism." and "Dr. Ibrahim Abu Mohamed have consistently and unequivocally condemned all forms of terrorist violence."

In December 2015 Abu Mohamed, along with other high-profile imams, issued a new year's message supporting a fatwa condemning Islamic State. In the message they stated that "most Islamic Legal Circles and Fatwa Boards have condemned ISIS", and warned young people to avoid the organisation's propaganda.

Abu Mohamed, in a submission to a federal government inquiry, has called for the Racial Discrimination Act to be updated to include protections against religious vilification. Liberal senator James Paterson, a member of the parliamentary joint committee on human rights said, “Effectively that would mean Australia has a national blasphemy law because criticising someone's religious beliefs in a way that offended them could breach the law".

Defamation case
In April 2016 Abu Mohamed commenced civil proceedings for defamation, against News Corporation for alleged damages relating to the publication of two articles.

See also

Australian Federation of Islamic Councils
Australian National Imams Council
Human rights in Islamic countries
Islam in Australia
Islamic organisations in Australia

References

External links
 MuslimVillage article

Al-Azhar University alumni
Living people
Australian imams
Australian people of Egyptian descent
Australian Islamists
Egyptian expatriates in the United Arab Emirates
Egyptian emigrants to Australia
Islam in Australia
Islamism in Australia
Sunni Islamists
Grand Muftis of Australia
Year of birth missing (living people)
People from Gharbia Governorate